KMZA is a radio station airing a country music format licensed to Seneca, Kansas, broadcasting on 92.1 MHz FM.  The station is owned by KNZA, INC.

References

External links

Country radio stations in the United States
MZA